Carl Johan Lennart Askinger (22 May 1922 – 13 April 1995) was a Swedish football defender who played for AIK Fotboll in Allsvenskan for seven seasons. Besides football Askinger also represented AIK in bandy and ice hockey. He was married to Märta and had two children, Jan and Jörgen. His wife Märta was a cousin of the wife of Ivan Bodin.

References

1922 births
1995 deaths
Footballers from Stockholm
Swedish footballers
Association football defenders
AIK Fotboll players
Allsvenskan players